The Orchards is a suburb in the mainplace Akasia of Gauteng, South Africa. It is situated to the north west of the Pretoria CBD and borders Rosslyn on its north western corner.

References

Suburbs of Pretoria